Agriculture and Agri-Food Canada (AAFC; sometimes Ag-Canada) is the department of the Government of Canada responsible for the federal regulation of agriculture, including policies governing the production, processing, and marketing of all farm, food, and agri-based products. Agriculture in Canada is a shared jurisdiction and the department works with the provinces and territories in the development and delivery of policies and programs.

The minister of agriculture and agri-food (currently Marie-Claude Bibeau) is responsible for the department to Parliament. While the minister is head of the department, and provides policy/political direction, the day-to-day operations of the department are managed by the deputy minister (currently Stefanie Beck), who is a public servant.

History
The Department of Agriculture for Canada was formed in 1867. It was organized under the Department of Agriculture Act, which was passed by Parliament and given royal assent on 22 May 1868.

The first minister of agriculture, Jean-Charles Chapais, and his deputy, Dr. Joseph Charles Taché, were soon presenting important Bills to the House of Commons for the protection and improvement of Canadian agriculture. One of the first Bills was an Act Respecting Contagious Diseases of Animals, passed in 1869. This law gave the chief veterinary inspector, Dr. Duncan McEachran, who was also the dean of medicine at McGill University, authority to prevent the introduction of animal diseases into Canada.

Other responsibilities 
In addition to agriculture, the minister and the department had many other wide-ranging national responsibilities including immigration, public health, censuses and statistics, patents, copyrights, and trademarks. Over time, these other responsibilities were transferred to other departments. For example, the collection of statistics was transferred to the Dominion Bureau of Statistics (now Statistics Canada) in 1918, and healthcare in Canada was transferred to the Department of Health when it was created in 1919.

Portfolio organizations 
Today, organizations for which the minister of agriculture and agri-food is responsible for include:
 Canada Agricultural Review Tribunal
 Canadian Dairy Commission
 Canadian Grain Commission
 Farm Credit Canada
 Farm Products Council of Canada
 Canadian Pari-Mutuel Agency
In 2013, the Canadian Food Inspection Agency was moved from the Agriculture Portfolio to the Health Portfolio.

Legislation 
Agriculture and Agri-Food Canada is responsible for a number of laws related to agriculture and food in Canada.
Agricultural Marketing Programs Act
Agricultural Products Marketing Act
Animal Pedigree Act
Canada Grain Act
Canadian Agricultural Loans Act
Canadian Dairy Commission Act
Canada Grain Act
Department of Agriculture and Agri-Food Act
Experimental Farm Stations Act
Farm Debt Mediation Act
Farm Credit Canada Act
Farm Income Protection Act
Farm Products Agencies Act
Prairie Farm Rehabilitation Act

Research 

As part of Agriculture and Agri-Food Canada, the Science and Technology Branch has the mandate to propose solutions and opportunities based on science to support competitiveness and the sustainability of the agriculture and agri-food sector. It is also in the Branch's mandate to provide scientific information to inform departmental and governmental decision processes.

Under the Experimental Farm Stations Act dating back to 1886, farm stations across Canada were established, including the Central Experimental Farm. The officers of these stations had the duty of conducting research in a number of specific areas pertinent to agricultural productivity and conservation, and of making the results of such research known by publication.

Today, the Science and Technology Branch includes a national network of 20 Research and Development Centres and 30 satellite research locations. The Science and Technology Branch has approximately 2,200 employees, including some 400 research scientists.

The goal of all activities is to address the major scientific challenges facing 21st century agricultural production systems:

 Increasing agricultural productivity,
 Enhancing environmental performance,
 Improving attributes for food and non-food uses,
 Addressing threats to the agriculture and agri-food value chain.

Industry support 

Agriculture and Agri-Food Canada is also responsible for supporting corporate and local agricultural producers and suppliers. They do this through a variety of programs and services including Agri-Geomatics which develops products and services for internal and external users, and program facilitation.

The department supports market growth through its market access and trade negotiation activities, and it works with Canada's provinces and territories to promote Canadian products. The department also supports industry by focusing on science and technology advances and helping producers mitigate risks.

Notable people

Botany

 Faith Fyles  (1875-1961), botanical artist

 Felicitas Svejda (1920-2016), creator of the explorer roses

Cereals and Pulses 

 Nancy Ames, researcher of barley

 Vern Burrows (1930-2020), international authority on oat breeding and utilisation

 Jennifer Mitchell Fetch, expert in oat breeding

 Soon Jai Park (1937-2018), author of dry bean breeding program

 Charles E. Saunders (1867-1937), inventor of the 'Marquis' wheat cultivar

Climate Change, Sustainable Agricultural Practices, and Nutrient Cycling 

 Raymond Desjardins, expert in agricultural meteorology and climate change

 Barbara Cade-Menun, world leader in studying phosphorus cycling

 Guy Lafond (d. 2013), researcher in no-till farming

Earth Observation 

 Heather McNairn, specialist in remote sensing technology

 Elizabeth Pattey, specialist in micrometeorology

Food Processing 

 Joyce Boye, specialist in value-added food processing, food safety and food quality 

 Mary MacArthur, researcher on the processes of dehydration and freezing of fresh foods, first woman to be  named as fellow of the Agricultural Institute of Canada (1952)

 Michèle Marcotte, creator of the method of osmotic dehydration of food

Horticulture 

 Donald A. Young (1929-2015), developed new sorts of potatoes

Pest Management  

 Karen Bailey, specialist in plant pathology and biopesticide development

 Deena Errampalli, worked on postharvest pathology of temperate tree fruits

Plant Genetics 

 Sylvie Cloutier, specialist in molecular genetics

Livestock 

 Karen Beauchemin  (b. 1956), international authority on methane emissions and ruminant nutrition

 Helene Lapierre, researcher of animal metabolism  

 Karen Schwartzkopf-Genswein, expert in farm animal behaviour, health and welfare

Mycology and Plant Pathology 

 Yolande Dalpé (1948), first mycologist in Ottawa to study the taxonomy of mycorrhizal fungi

 Mary Elizabeth Elliott  

 Margaret Newton  

 Mildred K. Nobles  

 Luella Weresub

Oil Seeds 

 Keith Downey 

 Isobel Parkin

Soil Fertility 
 Constantine Campbell
 Cynthia Grant  
 G. Clarke Topp  
 Noura Ziadi

See also
 Canadian Agricultural Safety Association
 Prairie Farm Rehabilitation Administration
 Secretary of State (Rural)

References

Notes

External links
 
 

 
Federal departments and agencies of Canada
Agricultural organizations based in Canada
Canada
Regulators of biotechnology products
Ministries established in 1868
1868 establishments in Canada
Regulators of Canada